The governor of Chhattisgarh is a nominal head and representative of the president of India in the state of Chhattisgarh. The governor is appointed by the president for a maximum period of five years. The current governor, since 12 February 2023, is Biswabhusan Harichandan.

Powers and functions

The governor enjoys many different types of powers:

Executive powers related to administration, appointments and removals,
Legislative powers related to lawmaking and the state legislature, that is Vidhan Sabha or Vidhan Parishad, and
Discretionary powers to be carried out according to the discretion of the governor.

Governors of Chhattisgarh

See also
 Governors of India
 Powers and functions of the governors of India

References

External links
http://www.dprcg.gov.in/content/%E0%A4%B0%E0%A4%BE%E0%A4%9C%E0%A5%8D%E0%A4%AF%E0%A4%AA%E0%A4%BE%E0%A4%B2-%E0%A4%AA%E0%A4%B0%E0%A4%BF%E0%A4%9A%E0%A4%AF

Chhattisgarh
Governors